The Federal Home Loan Bank Act, is a United States federal law passed under President Herbert Hoover in order to lower the cost of home ownership. It established the Federal Home Loan Bank Board to charter and supervise federal savings and loan institutions.  It also created the Federal Home Loan Banks which lend to building and loan associations, cooperative banks, homestead associations, insurance companies, savings banks, community development financial institutions, and insured depository institutions in order to finance home mortgages.

Amendments

Successful
The act was notably amended by Financial Institutions Reform, Recovery and Enforcement Act of 1989, which transferred regulation of thrifts to the Office of Thrift Supervision.

Proposed
On November 21, 2013, Rep. Steve Stivers introduced the bill To amend the Federal Home Loan Bank Act to authorize privately insured credit unions to become members of a Federal home loan bank (H.R. 3584; 113th Congress) into the United States House of Representatives. The bill would amend the Federal Home Loan Bank Act to treat certain privately insured credit unions as insured depository institutions for purposes of determining eligibility for membership in a federal home loan bank. The bill was scheduled to be voted on under a suspension of the rules on May 6, 2014.

References
Notes

External links

 Federal Home Loan Bank Act (PDF/details) as amended in the GPO Statute Compilations collection
 History and text of the Act at the Federal Housing Finance Agency web page

1932 in American law
72nd United States Congress
United States federal banking legislation
United States federal housing legislation
Mortgage legislation